Allium truncatum is a plant species found in Israel, Palestine, Lebanon and Turkey. It is a bulb-forming perennial producing an umbel of many urn-shaped purple flowers.

References

truncatum
Onions
Flora of Turkey
Flora of Israel
Flora of Palestine (region)
Flora of Lebanon
Plants described in 1943